Samuel "Sam" Meredith (5 September 1872 – 25 December 1921) was a Welsh footballer, who played in the English Football League for Stoke where he made fifty appearances as well as eight appearances for the Wales national team. His brother, Billy, was also a Welsh international footballer.

Career
Meredith was born Trefonen and played for Chirk AAA before joining Stoke City in 1901. He was a regular in his first season at the Victoria Ground making 31 appearances in 1901–02 but then was used as back-up by manager Horace Austerberry. He left in 1904 for Leyton having played 50 matches for Stoke.

Career statistics

Club
Source:

International
Source:

References

1872 births
1921 deaths
Welsh footballers
Wales international footballers
Chirk AAA F.C. players
Stoke City F.C. players
English Football League players
Leyton F.C. players
Association football fullbacks